Greatest Hits is a 2007 compilation album by American country music singer Sara Evans. It features ten of her greatest hits from her second through fifth albums, as well as four newly recorded tracks.

Content
Greatest Hits chronicles the highest-peaking singles from Evans' second through fifth studio albums: 1998's No Place That Far, 2000's Born to Fly, 2003's Restless, and 2005's Real Fine Place. All of the selections from these albums reached the Top 20 or higher on the US Billboard Hot Country Songs charts. No tracks are included from her 1997 debut album Three Chords and the Truth, which did not produce any Top 40 country hits. Among the previously released tracks are her first four number one hits: 1999's "No Place That Far", 2001's "Born to Fly", 2004's "Suds in the Bucket", and 2005's "A Real Fine Place to Start".

In addition to the previously released tracks, Greatest Hits includes four previously unreleased tracks: "As If", "Love You with All My Heart", "Pray for You", and "Some Things Never Change". In mid-2007, "As If" was released as the first single from this album, and it peaked at number 11 on the country charts. "Some Things Never Change" was released in early 2008 as the second single. This song reached number 26 on the country charts. "Love You with All My Heart," the third single, failed to chart after its release on June 23, 2008.

Promotion
Evans promoted this album with her The Greatest tour from late 2007 through late 2008.

Track listing

Personnel on new tracks
 Paul Bushnell - bass guitar
 Dan Dugmore - pedal steel guitar
 Matt Evans - background vocals
 Sara Evans - lead vocals, background vocals
 Vince Gill - background vocals
 Charlie Judge - keyboards, Hammond organ, piano, programming
 Abe Laboriel Jr. - drums
 Hillary Lindsey - background vocals
 Chris McHugh - drums
 Jeff Rothchild - drums, programming
 John Shanks - bass guitar, acoustic guitar, electric guitar, piano, background vocals
 Ashley Evans Simpson - background vocals
 Jonathan Yudkin - banjo, upright bass, cello, fiddle, harmonium, mandolin, viola, violin

Chart performance

Weekly charts

Year-end charts

Singles

Certifications

References

2007 greatest hits albums
Sara Evans albums
RCA Records compilation albums